{{Infobox football club season
| club               = Wellington Phoenix
| season             = 2022–23
| chairman           = Rob Morrison
| manager            = Ufuk Talay
| stadium            = Sky Stadium
| league             = A-League Men
| league result      = 5th
| cup1               = Australia Cup
| cup1 result        = Quarter-finals
| league topscorer   = Oskar Zawada (12) 
| season topscorer   = Oskar Zawada (12)
| highest attendance = 10,420vs. Sydney FC(12 March 2023)A-League Men
| lowest attendance  = 2,502vs. Western Sydney Wanderers(10 December 2022)A-League Men
| average attendance = 
| largest win        = 4–0vs. Devonport City (A)(3 August 2022)Australia Cup
| largest loss       = 1–5vs. Adelaide United (A)(17 March 2023)A-League Men
| pattern_la1        = 
| pattern_b1         = 
| pattern_ra1        = 
| pattern_sh1        = 
| pattern_so1        = 
| leftarm1           = 
| body1              = 
| rightarm1          = 
| shorts1            = 
| socks1             = 
| pattern_la2        = 
| pattern_b2         = 
| pattern_ra2        = 
| pattern_sh2        = 
| pattern_so2        = 
| leftarm2           = 
| body2              = 
| rightarm2          = 
| shorts2            = 
| socks2             = 
| pattern_la3        = 
| pattern_b3         = 
| pattern_ra3        = 
| pattern_sh3        = 
| pattern_so3        = 
| leftarm3           = 
| body3              = 
| rightarm3          = 
| shorts3            = 
| socks3             = 
| updated            = 12 March 2023
| prevseason         = 2021–22
| nextseason         = 2023–24}}
The 2022–23 season is the 16th in the history of Wellington Phoenix Football Club. In addition to the domestic league, the club also participated in the Australia Cup for the eighth time.

Players

Transfers

Transfers in

Transfers out

Contract extensions

Technical staff

Pre-season and friendlies

Competitions

Overview

A-League Men

League table

Results summary

Results by round

Matches

Australia Cup 

Statistics

Appearances and goals

|-
|colspan="16"|Goalkeepers:|-

|-
|colspan="16"|Defenders:|-

|-
|colspan="16"|Midfielders:|-

|-
|colspan="16"|Forwards:|-

|-
! colspan=16 style=background:#dcdcdc; text-align:center| Players who left during the season but made an appearance
|-

|-

Disciplinary recordIncludes all competitions. The list is sorted by squad number when total cards are equal. Players with no cards not included in the list.''

Clean sheets

Includes all competitive matches. The list is sorted by squad number when total clean sheets are equal.

See also
 2022–23 Wellington Phoenix FC (A-League Women) season
 2022–23 A-League Men

References

External links
 Wellington Phoenix official website

Wellington Phoenix FC seasons
2022–23 A-League Men season by team